Félix Pérez Cardozo (20 November 1908 – 9 June 1952) was a Paraguayan harpist.

Pérez Cardozo died on June 9, 1952 in Buenos Aires, Argentina.

Beginnings 
Pérez Cardozo was born to Teodoro Pérez and Cándida Rosa Cardozo in the small town of Hyaty in the state of Guairá.

As is common amongst musicians of the Paraguayan countryside, Pérez Cardozo learned the basics of playing from other harpists, without seeking tutelage from any one master.

He was part of a paradigmatic trio consisting of one harp and two guitars, along with Ampelio Villalba and Diosnel Chase. He received support from the poet Pedro José Carlés, with whom he traveled to the Paraguayan capital city Asunción in 1928. During this time they would play at folk music festivals organized in the "Teatro Granados" by Aristóbulo "Nonón" Domínguez, as well as in night clubs.

In 1931 he and his band left for Buenos Aires, Argentina, where most of his artistic career took place. They were the first of a long list of Paraguayan musicians that would consequently succeed in the Argentine capital for more than half a century.

Career 
In a short period of time, the individualistic style of Pérez Cardozo's interpretations of various compositions quickly gained him wide public recognition. He was a member of several bands until in 1945 he formed his own group. He enjoyed huge fame in Buenos Aires and throughout all the Río de la Plata area. His success was such that a street in Mendoza was named after him.

Family
He married the Argentinian Victoria Sanchez - with whom he had three children: Angela Rosa, Bienbenida and Victor.

Works 
Among his greatest harp compositions are found:  
"Guyra campana"
"Carreta guýpe", (debajo de la carreta)
"Jataity"
"Llegada"
"Mi despedida"
"Angela Rosa"
"Che vallemi Hyaty"
"Che vallemi Yaguarón"
"En tí hallé consuelo"
"Tren lechero"
"El sueño de Angelita"

He wrote music for various verses of  distinguished poets such as Víctor Montórfano ("Tetagua sapukái", a true anthem in which "grito del pueblo" (the shout of the people) claims better days for Paraguay) Antonio Ortiz Mayans ("Burrerita", "Pasionaria", "Puntanita", "Asunceña" y "Taperé"),  ("Rosa"), Rigoberto Fontao Meza ("El arriero"), Andrés Pereira ("Mariposa mi"), the Argentine Hilario Cuadros ("Los sesenta granaderos", known throughout Argentina as a very popular Anthem.), also the most important poet of Paraguayan history Emiliano R. Fernández, whose piece is seen as a pillar of Paraguayan epic music due to the rhythmic power, melodic beauty and patriotic content of the following texts ("1º de Marzo", "Che la reina (Ahama che china)", and the lovable song  ("Oda pasional", "Oñondiveminte"), ("Desde la selva" y "Primavera").Likewise "Caaguy ryakua", "Isla Pukú", the recompilation of "Jaha che ndive", "Lui ryevu", "Misiones".

Later years 
The great "mitá guazú" (big boy) died suddenly  in Buenos Aires, Argentina, on 9 June 1952. Atahualpa Yupanki, a fundamental icon of inspirational folk music and poetry in this century in Argentina, sang "Canción del arpa dormida" in his honor (set to music by Herminio Giménez)

See also 
List of harpists

References 

 Centro Cultural de la República El Cabildo
 Diccionario Biográfico "FORJADORES DEL PARAGUAY", Primera Edición Enero de 2000. Distribuidora Quevedo de Ediciones. Buenos Aires, Argentina.
Lorenzo Manlio Paris (2008) "Félix Perez Cardozo, su vida y su música" Editorial ServiLibro, Asunción, Paraguay 
Luis Szaran (2007) Diccionario de la Música Paraguaya" Edicción de la Jesuitenmission, Nuremberg, Germany

External links 

Melodías Paraguayas
Staff
Musicas Paraguayas

Paraguayan harpists
1908 births
1952 deaths